Wabash Township is one of eleven townships in Fountain County, Indiana. As of the 2010 census, its population was 783 and it contained 336 housing units.

Geography

Unincorporated towns
 Coal Creek
 Mackie
(This list is based on USGS data and may include former settlements.)

Major highways
 Indiana State Road 32

References
 United States Census Bureau cartographic boundary files
 U.S. Board on Geographic Names

External links
 Indiana Township Association
 United Township Association of Indiana

Townships in Fountain County, Indiana
Townships in Indiana